Jiang Huan (Chinese: 姜环; Pinyin: Jiāng Huán) is a character featured within the famed classic Chinese novel Fengshen Yanyi. 

At one point in time following the Queen Jiang arc, Jiang Huan would appear before Grand Counselor Fei Zhong and claim that he had been living within Fei Zhong's household for over five years. Once Fei Zhong told Jiang Huan the evil plot to kill the queen, Jiang would reply with the words: "My lord, your wish is my duty even if I have to go through fire and boiling oil. I will carry out your wish without a moment of hesitation!" As planned, one day Jiang Huan would run in front of the king, while passing through the Nine Dragon Bridge and claim that he must kill him so that Queen Jiang's father, the Grand Duke of the East would attain kingship. Jiang Huan would be captured but would avoid harm due to Daji and the lack of information. 

Once Queen Jiang had already been falsely tortured within her palace, and Concubine Huang continuously appeared before the king to plead for her majesty's life, the accused Jiang Huan was told to confront the queen. Once the queen saw Jiang Huan before her, and barked many words of great anger, Jiang Huan would sarcastically respond, "Oh, my Queen. You were the one who ordered me to do it! Could I not obey? This is a fact. Don't you deny it!" Once the two young princes appeared and the queen, in a large pool of blood, said her final words of regret to avenge the cruelty placed on her, the Crown Prince would charge at Jiang Huan with his sword and cut him in two; thus, with blood splattered across the walls, Jiang Huan would meet his end.

References
 Investiture of the Gods chapter 7 - 8

Investiture of the Gods characters